Abdel-Aziz Fahmy Ahmed Abdel-Wahab Shehata (1914 – 1991) was an Egyptian football goalkeeper who played for Egypt in the 1934 FIFA World Cup. He also played for Al Ahly and Zamalek

References

Egyptian footballers
Egypt international footballers
Association football goalkeepers
Al Ahly SC players
1934 FIFA World Cup players
1914 births
1991 deaths